Featherstonhaugh Lake is a lake in the U.S. state of New York.

Featherstonhaugh Lake was named after the local Featherstonhaugh family.

References

Bodies of water of Schenectady County, New York
Lakes of New York (state)